Preston Workshops is the heavy maintenance facility for the Melbourne tram network. The workshop is located on a block surrounded by Miller Street, St George's Road, Oakover Road and the Mernda railway line in Preston, a suburb of Melbourne, Australia. Following a major redevelopment in April 2016, it also became an operational depot under the name New Preston Depot, taking over from East Preston.

History

The Preston Workshops were erected by the Melbourne & Metropolitan Tramways Board (MMTB) in 1924-26, to provide manufacturing and maintenance facilities for Melbourne's trams in conjunction with the introduction and production of the W class trams.

The earlier tram maintenance workshops were located on the corner of Holden Street and St Georges Road, Fitzroy, where today only a tramways substation remains, following demolition and sale in 1937.

In the mid-1920s, the MMTB sought a suitable place to build its own tramcars, having previously manufactured the steel chassis and truck frames at the Cable Repair Workshops at Nicholson Street, Fitzroy North, built the wooden bodywork in temporary sheds behind the Fitzroy cable car shed, done painting and varnishing at Preston and Glenhuntly depots, and let tenders to private companies for completed bodies. The running maintenance and overhaul was conducted at workshops attached to the Malvern, Hawthorn, Coburg and Essendon depots.

A single comprehensive workshop was desperately needed, and a site was ultimately chosen opposite Thornbury depot on St Georges Road adjacent to the Miller Street line, covering 17 acres. Tenders were let progressively for each building - the paint and car erecting shops and first traverser completed early in 1925; the main store and sub-station in 1925/26; the large truck, wheel, machine, fitting and electrical shops and second traverser to the car shop in late 1926; the timber storage racks, office block, blacksmiths and plate shops, foundry and pattern shop in the next few months; and finally the mess hall and amenities.

Preston became the most modern tramway workshop in Australia and took over the maintenance, overhaul and new construction tasks for the whole system. W-class cars were built to replace cable trams for the cable conversions, and subsequently W1 and W2 types were built at the workshops.

A distinctive workplace culture grew up around the workshops, evident in the oral traditions and characters of the workshops, such as Norm Cross, who may have been the inspiration for Malcolm in the film of the same name by Nadia Tass.

The Tudor style “Melbourne Room” which provided a ball-room, theatre, concert and lecture hall for tram events, still features the gaily decorated stage that hosted 3DB's Lunchtime Funtime with Bill Collins.

In the 1990s, part of the works was leased to A Goninan & Co to refurbish Z1 and Z2 class trams as well as fit out light rail vehicles for the Hong Kong Light Rail system.

In 2014, a project commenced to revitalise the workshop. The heavy maintenance facility was reconfigured, a new servicing facility for the E-class trams built and seven kilometres of track relaid. It was officially reopened in 17 April 2016 as New Preston Depot, replacing East Preston.

Rolling stock
As at December 2019, the depot had an allocation of 58 trams: 58 E Class.

Routes
The following routes are operated from Preston depot:
11: West Preston to Victoria Harbour Docklands 
86:  Bundoora RMIT to Waterfront City Docklands

References

External links

Heritage Listing
Culture Victoria, Oral history interview
Railpage Tram Photo Gallery

Railway workshops in Victoria (Australia)
Tram depots in Melbourne
Transport infrastructure completed in 1926
1926 establishments in Australia
Buildings and structures in the City of Darebin
Heritage-listed buildings in Melbourne
Transport in the City of Darebin